Carrillo Puerto Municipality is a municipality in Veracruz, Mexico, located in the central area of the State of Veracruz, at . It has a surface of 246.76 km2 and a population of 18,888 as of 2020. Its seat is Tamarindo (1,209 inhabitants) and its most populated town is El Palmar (1,259).

The municipality of  Carrillo Puerto  is delimited to the north by Paso del Macho, to the north-east by Soledad de Doblado, to the east by Cotaxtla, to the south-east by Cuichapa and to the west by Cuitláhuac.  

Its main crops are maize and beans. 

The main popular celebration takes place in May, to honor Isidore the Laborer, patron saint of the town.

Weather in Carrillo Puerto is warm and dry most of the year, with a rainy season in Summer.

References

External links 

  Municipal Official Site
  Municipal Official Information

Municipalities of Veracruz